DYMD-TV, channel 33, is a commercial television relay station owned by TV5. Its transmitter located at Iloilo-Capiz National Highway, Brgy, Cabugao, Roxas, Capiz. The station began its operations in 2015.

TV and radio stations nationwide

References

External links 
 Official Site

 

Television stations in Roxas, Capiz
TV5 (Philippine TV network) stations
Television channels and stations established in 2015